Chascotheca is a genus of plants in the family Phyllanthaceae described as a genus in 1904. It is native to the western Caribbean.

Species
 Chascotheca neopeltandra (Griseb.) Urb. - Cuba, Hispaniola, Cayman Islands
 Chascotheca triplinervia (Müll.Arg.) G.L.Webster - Cuba

References

Phyllanthaceae
Flora of the Caribbean
Phyllanthaceae genera